Stepan is an urban-type settlement in Sarny Raion (district) of Rivne Oblast (province) in western Ukraine. Its population was 4,073 as of the 2001 Ukrainian Census. Current population: 

The settlement is located in the historic Volhynia region of Ukraine, on the left bank of the Horyn, a tributary of the Prypiat.

History
The first written mention of Stepan dates back to 1290. In 1900, the Jewish population of Stepan totaled 1,854. During the World War II occupation of Ukraine, the Nazi German occupying forces established a Jewish ghetto, where nearly 3000 Jews were killed. In 1960, Stepan acquired the status of an urban-type settlement.

People from Stepan
 Stanisław Gabriel Worcell (1799–1857), socialist Polish revolutionary

See also
 Klesiv, the other urban-type settlement in Sarny Raion of Rivne Oblast

References

External links
 

Urban-type settlements in Sarny Raion
Populated places established in the 13th century
Volhynian Voivodeship (1569–1795)
Volhynian Governorate
Wołyń Voivodeship (1921–1939)
Shtetls
Holocaust locations in Ukraine